is a Japanese tokusatsu television drama, the 45th entry in Toei's long-running Super Sentai series, and the second produced in the Reiwa era. Additionally, it commemorates the 45th anniversary of the Super Sentai franchise and is the second special anniversary series following Kaizoku Sentai Gokaiger.

The show succeeded Mashin Sentai Kiramager, joining Kamen Rider Saber, and later, Kamen Rider Revice in the Super Hero Time line-up on TV Asahi on March 7, 2021. The show's name comes from the titular team's catchphrase, . A direct sequel, titled Avataro Sentai Donbrothers, aired following the finale.

Zenkaiger also aired in South Korea as Power Rangers Zenkaiger.

Plot

One month ago, a strange phenomenon suddenly fused the human world with the parallel world of Kikaitopia, who had previously conquered and sealed off various universes, including those of the previous 44 Super Sentai. Despite this, humans and Kikainoids quickly get along and live peacefully together.

In the present, however, their lives are threatened by Kikaitopia's evil rulers, the Tozitend Dynasty, who seek to conquer all parallel worlds. To face this new threat, a brave and energetic young man named Kaito Goshikida inherits the powers of all previous Super Sentai. Transforming into Zenkaizer, he joins forces with the Kikainoids Juran, Gaon, Magine, and Vroon to save the multiverse from Tozitend and find Kaito's missing parents as the Zenkaigers. The conflict later intensifies with the arrival of the World Pirates. Led by Zocks Goldtsuiker, who can transform into Twokaizer, the World Pirates oppose Tozitend in pursuit of their own objectives and occasionally ally with the Zenkaigers for the sake of it.

Episodes

Production
The trademark for the series was filed by Toei Company on September 8, 2020.

According to producer Shinichiro Shirakura, the show's diversity in its titular members, featuring a human and four Kikainoids, is due to the Super Sentai series' recurring themes of diversity in its group of protagonists while maintaining strong characters. The reason why Zenkaizer was chosen as the leader despite being colored white is to ensure that he would stand out in future crossovers when grouped alongside other Red Rangers. The four Kikainoids were based on the non-human members of Uchu Sentai Kyuranger. Although Zenkaiger is open to the idea of featuring past heroes in certain episodes, Shirakura mentioned that it will not be done in a similar way to Kaizoku Sentai Gokaiger. As members of the Zenkaigers combine to form the series' mecha, ZenkaiOh, the original plan was for their combined forms to appear human-sized at first, but as the show needed to keep up with the toy releases, this idea was scrapped and eventually implemented in the sequel series Avataro Sentai Donbrothers through the titular group's mecha, Don Onitaijin.

After series voice actor Tatsuhisa Suzuki chose to go on hiatus, his role as Gege was rendered voiceless between episodes 21 and 25. Toei later announced Masaya Fukunishi will take over the role of Gege from episode 25 onward.

Reception
Kikai Sentai Zenkaiger is ranked 19th place in the 2021's "100 Internet Buzzwords" in Japan, held by Nico Nico Pedia and Pixiv Encyclopedia. The physical award is given to Toei's producers of the series, Shinichiro Shirakura, Naomi Takebe, Kōichi Yada and Akihiro Fukada during the award ceremony in December 15, 2021.

Films

Red Battle! All Sentai Great Assemble!!
Naoya Makoto, Kei Hosogai, and Jingi Irie reprise their respective roles as Tsuyoshi Kaijo/Akarenger, Basco Ta Jolokia, and Zamigo Delma. Additionally, Nobutoshi Canna and Megumi Han reprise their respective voice roles as Bangray and Kyuemon Izayoi. The events of the film take place between episode 6 of the regular series and the companion web series Kikai Sentai Zenkaiger Spin-Off: Zenkai Red Great Introduction!.

Super Hero Senki
 
 is a crossover film released on July 22, 2021, starring the cast from Zenkaiger and Kamen Rider Saber, as well as featuring characters from past entries of the franchises involved. The film is part of the celebrations for both the 45th anniversary of the Super Sentai franchise and the 50th anniversary of the Kamen Rider franchise, and serves as the final crossover between them. Actors Fuku Suzuki and Ayumi Tanida portrayed Shotaro Ishinomori and the film's main antagonist, Asmodeus, respectively. Moreover, Kenjirō Ishimaru of Kamen Rider Den-O; Takashi Ukaji of Kamen Rider OOO; So Okuno of Kamen Rider Zi-O; Fumiya Takahashi of Kamen Rider Zero-One; Shogo Suzuki of Samurai Sentai Shinkenger; Atomu Mizuishi of Mashin Sentai Kiramager; and Hiroshi Fujioka of Kamen Rider (1971 - 1973) reprise their respective roles while Naoya Makoto of Himitsu Sentai Gorenger; Toshihiko Seki, Kōji Yusa, Masaki Terasoma, and Kenichi Suzumura of Kamen Rider Den-O; Tetsu Inada of Tokusou Sentai Dekaranger; and M·A·O and Hiroshi Kamiya of Uchu Sentai Kyuranger; and Rikiya Koyama of Kamen Rider Zi-O reprise their respective voice roles. Additionally, the two main characters of the then-upcoming Kamen Rider Revice made their first appearances and a prequel film for the series was double billed with Super Hero Senki. The events of the film take place between the two-part Movie Release Commemorative Combo Special and episode 21 of the series.

Special episodes
 is a two-episode web-exclusive series released on Telasa on March 21, 2021. Additionally, Satomi Hirose of Ninja Sentai Kakuranger makes an appearance. The events of the special take place between Kikai Sentai Zenkaiger the Movie: Red Battle! All Sentai Great Assemble!! and episode 7 of the series.

 is a twelve-episode puppetry short series included as part of the Blu-ray releases of Kikai Sentai Zenkaiger.

TBA

TBA

 is a web-exclusive crossover series released on Toei Tokusatsu Fan Club on June 5, 2022, featuring characters from Zenkaiger and Kaizoku Sentai Gokaiger. Ryota Ozawa, Yui Koike, and Junya Ikeda return to reprise their respective roles as Captain Marvelous/Gokai Red, Ahim de Famille/Gokai Pink, and Gai Ikari/Gokai Silver respectively.

V-Cinema

Zenkaiger vs. Kiramager vs. Senpaiger
 is a V-Cinema release that features a crossover between Zenkaiger and Mashin Sentai Kiramager. The V-Cinema received a limited theatrical release on April 29, 2022, followed by its DVD and Blu-ray release on September 28, 2022. Additionally, Ryota Ozawa of Kaizoku Sentai Gokaiger and Asahi Ito of Kaitou Sentai Lupinranger VS Keisatsu Sentai Patranger reprised their respective roles as Captain Marvelous/Gokai Red and Kairi Yano/Lupin Red. The events of the V-Cinema take place after the final episode of the series.

Donbrothers vs. Zenkaiger
 is an upcoming V-Cinema release that features a crossover between Zenkaiger and Avataro Sentai Donbrothers. The V-Cinema is scheduled for a limited theatrical release on May 3, 2023, followed by its DVD and Blu-ray release on September 27, 2023. The events of the V-Cinema take place a year after the final episode of Donbrothers.

Cast
: 
 : 
: 
: 
: 
: 
: 
: 
: 
: 
: 
: 
: 
: 
: , 
: 
: 
: 
Zenkaiger Equipment Voice: Lenne Hardt
Geardalinger Voice: 
Zenryoku Zenkai Cannon Voice: 
Narration:

Guest cast
: 
: 
: 
:

Theme song

Lyrics: 
Composition & Arrangement: 
Artist: 
Chorus:

Notes

References

External links
 at TV Asahi 
 at Toei Company 
 at Super-Sentai.net 
 for Kikai Sentai Zenkaiger the Movie 
 for Kikai Sentai Zenkaiger vs. Kiramager vs. Senpaiger 
 for Avataro Sentai Donbrothers vs. Zenkaiger 

Crossover tokusatsu television series
Super Sentai
2021 Japanese television series debuts
2022 Japanese television series endings
Television series about parallel universes
TV Asahi original programming